Mark Scanlon is an Australian surfer known for pioneering surfing in the Maldives along with fellow Australian Tony Hussein Hinde.

In 1973 Scanlon and Hinde were shipwrecked on the North Malé atoll in the Maldives aboard the Whitewings, a ketch in which they had been hired as crewmembers. The Whitewings had been en route across the Indian Ocean from Sri Lanka to Réunion Island when they ran aground. The pair spent several unplanned months in the Maldives repairing the boat. However, he quickly discovered how good the surfing potential was in the northern Maldives and decided to stay in the country.

In 2000, Scanlon was arrested in the Maldives for possession of cannabis. He was released in 2002 after diplomatic intervention by then-Australian Prime Minister John Howard.

References

Australian surfers
Australian emigrants to the Maldives
Year of birth missing (living people)
Living people